Byambasuren Sharav (13 November 1952 – 15 July 2019) was a Mongolian composer and pianist.

Life
Sharav was born in Jargaltkhaan Sum in Khentii Province. He learned as a child from his father to play the accordion. As a music teacher at an elementary school, he began to compose children's songs. From 1975 he studied at the Sverdlovsk Conservatory in the Soviet Union. He died July 15, 2019.

Work
Byambasuren Sharav composed over 200 songs and composed for more than twenty major motion pictures, eight concertos for Mongolian folk instruments, three symphonies, and four ballets. He was commissioned by Yo-Yo Ma for the Silk Road Project in 2000, for which he wrote his piece Legend of Herlen. Also of note is his Genghis Khan composition (2003). Two of his compositions featured at the Stanford Pan-Asian Music Festival in February 2011.

Awards
He was given the Honored Art Worker of Mongolia Award in 2002.

He was also given the Labor Hero (Mongolian : Хөдөлмөрийн баатар) in 2019.

References

External links
 Official site

Mongolian composers
1952 births
2019 deaths
Mongolian classical pianists
People from Khentii Province
Male composers
20th-century composers
21st-century composers
21st-century accordionists
Male classical pianists
21st-century classical pianists
20th-century male musicians
21st-century male musicians